The House at 32 Bayview Avenue in Quincy, Massachusetts, is a modest Queen Anne style house built on the shore during Quincy's development of that area as a summer resort area.  It was built in the 1880s, sited to take advantage of the views of the Town River to the north.  It features relatively modest stylistic details, including varying gable sizes with bargeboard, and a wraparound porch with square posts and some Stick style woodwork.

The house was listed on the National Register of Historic Places in 1989.

Gallery

See also
National Register of Historic Places listings in Quincy, Massachusetts

References

Houses in Quincy, Massachusetts
Queen Anne architecture in Massachusetts
Houses completed in 1880
National Register of Historic Places in Quincy, Massachusetts
Houses on the National Register of Historic Places in Norfolk County, Massachusetts